Nick Harris may refer to:

Nick Harris (punter) (born 1978), American football punter
Nick Harris (offensive lineman) (born 1998), American football offensive lineman
Nic Harris (born 1986), American football linebacker